Daku Ganga Jamuna is a Hindi-language action drama film directed by Kanti Shah and produced by Shakuntala Gohil. This film was released on 15 September 2000 in the banner of 5001 Films.

Plot
This is a story of vendetta between Bhura and Jwala. Bhura kills Jwala and Jwala's daughter Jamuna oaths  to take vengeance of the murder. She plans to kill Bhura as well as his daughter Ganga.

Cast
 Shakti Kapoor
 Raza Murad
Sapna (actress)
  Durgesh Nandini 
 Dinesh Hingoo
 Joginder
 Mohan Joshi
 Amit Pachori
 Anil Nagrath

References

External links

2000 films
2000s Hindi-language films
Indian action drama films
Films about outlaws
Indian films about revenge
2000s action drama films
2000 drama films
Films directed by Kanti Shah